Hassan Ameer Jones (born July 2, 1964) is a former professional American football player who was selected by the Minnesota Vikings in the 5th round of the 1986 NFL Draft. He played for the Clearwater High School Tornadoes.  A 6'0", 195-lb. wide receiver from Florida State, Jones played in eight NFL seasons from 1986 to 1993. His best year as a pro came during the 1990 season for the Vikings when he had 51 receptions for 810 yards and 7 touchdowns.

References

1964 births
Living people
Clearwater High School alumni
American football wide receivers
Florida State Seminoles football players
Minnesota Vikings players
Kansas City Chiefs players
Sportspeople from Clearwater, Florida
Players of American football from Tampa, Florida